Grenchen Süd railway station is a railway station in the municipality of Grenchen, in the Swiss canton of Solothurn. It is an intermediate stop on the Jura Foot line and is served by regional and long-distance trains.

Services 
 the following services stop at Grenchen Süd:

 InterCity: hourly service over the Jura Foot line between Lausanne and Zürich Hauptbahnhof.

References

External links 
 
 

Railway stations in the canton of Solothurn
Swiss Federal Railways stations